Józef Jan Andrzej Joachim Broel-Plater (15 November 1890 – 30 June 1941) was a Polish bobsledder. He competed in the four-man event at the 1928 Winter Olympics.

Plater volunteered for the French Army in October 1914, and fought in World War I. Afterwards he joined the Polish Army, and worked as a translator at its General Staff. In January 1940, he was arrested by Nazi German authorities and imprisoned in the Dachau concentration camp. He died there on 30 June 1941.

References

External links
 

1890 births
1941 deaths
People from Krāslava Municipality
People from Dvinsky Uyezd
20th-century Polish nobility
Polish male bobsledders
Polish translators
20th-century translators
Olympic bobsledders of Poland
Bobsledders at the 1928 Winter Olympics
French military personnel of World War I
Polish Army officers
Polish people who died in Dachau concentration camp
Polish civilians killed in World War II